Leonard Shlain (August 28, 1937 – May 11, 2009) was an American surgeon, author, and inventor. He was chairperson of laparoscopic surgery at the California Pacific Medical Center in San Francisco, and was an associate professor of surgery at University of California, San Francisco.

His books include Art & Physics: Parallel Visions in Space, Time, and Light (1991), The Alphabet Versus the Goddess (1998),  Sex, Time and Power: How Women's Sexuality Shaped Human Evolution (2003), and Leonardo's Brain: Understanding da Vinci's Creative Genius (2014).

Biography

Shlain was a native of Detroit who graduated from high school at the age of 15. After attending the University of Michigan, he earned an MD from Wayne State University School of Medicine at the age of 23. He served in the United States Army as a military base doctor in Saumur, France. Prior to his internship at UCSF Medical Center at Mount Zion in San Francisco, he worked for a short time at Bellevue Hospital in New York City. He also contributed to Academic Press' Encyclopedia of Creativity (1999), edited by Mark Runco and Steven Pritzker.

Personal life

Shlain had three children with Carole Lewis Jaffe: Kimberly Brooks (who is married to actor/comedian Albert Brooks), Jordan L. Shlain, and Tiffany Shlain, filmmaker and founder of the Webby Awards.

After he and Carole divorced, Shlain met and married his second wife, Superior Court Judge Ina Levin Gyemant.  They lived in Mill Valley, California where he died on May 11, 2009 (at age 71) after a year long struggle with brain cancer. The film Connected: An Autoblogography About Love, Death & Technology (2011), directed by Shlain's  daughter Tiffany, is in part a portrait of him.

See also
 Military medicine

References

External links
 Audio interview with Leonard Shlain
 Leonard Shlain biodata
 Leonard Shlain biodata in Science News article
 Interview with Leonard Shlain on what the alphabet engenders

1937 births
2009 deaths
American surgeons
Cultural historians
Jewish American writers
Deaths from brain cancer in the United States
Medical educators
Writers from Detroit
Writers from the San Francisco Bay Area
People from Mill Valley, California
University of California, San Francisco faculty
Deaths from cancer in California
Place of birth missing
University of Michigan alumni
20th-century surgeons
20th-century American non-fiction writers
20th-century American Jews
21st-century American Jews